Murg railway station is a railway station in Quarten, in the Swiss canton of St. Gallen. It is an intermediate stop on the Ziegelbrücke–Sargans line. The station is a short walk from the ferry across the Walensee to Quinten.

Layout and connections 
Murg has a  island platform with two tracks ( 1–2).  operates bus services from the station to Walenstadt.

Services 
Murg is served by the S4 of the St. Gallen S-Bahn:

 : hourly service via St. Gallen (circular operation).

References

External links 
 
 

Railway stations in the canton of St. Gallen
Swiss Federal Railways stations